Sophie Christine Martin (born 1984) is a French ballet dancer. She was a principal dancer with the Scottish Ballet between 2008 and 2022, before joining the Badisches Staatsballett Karlsruhe in the 2022/23 season.

Early life 
Sophie Martin was born in Cherbourg, France. As a teenager she moved to Paris and started her vocational training at the Conservatoire national supérieur de musique et de danse de Paris.

Career 
Martin joined the Scottish Ballet in 2003 under the directorship of Ashley Page. She was promoted to coryphée in 2005, soloist in 2006 and principal in 2008. In 2014 she performed at the XX Commonwealth Games opening ceremony and at the Ryder Cup Gala Concert in Glasgow. 

In September 2022 Martin joined the Badisches Staatsballett Karlsruhe in Germany in the 2022/23 season.

Selected repertoire
Martin's repertoire with the Scottish Ballet includes:

Martin's repertoire with Badisches Staatsballett Karlsruhe:

Awards
 The Herald Scottish Culture Awards, Outstanding Dance Performer 2019
 Sunday Herald Culture Awards, Best Dance Performer 2016
 Critic’s Circle National Dance Awards, Outstanding Female Performance (Classical) 2011
 Number 20 in The List magazine’s Hot 100 poll of influential figures in Scottish culture in December 2008

References 

Scottish Ballet principal dancers
1984 births
Living people
French ballerinas
Prima ballerinas
French expatriates in Scotland
21st-century French ballet dancers